Complete alphabetical listing of every song performed by the band Bright Eyes. The list totals 212 songs.

A
"Act of Contrition" (Noise Floor (Rarities: 1998–2005), 2006)
"All of the Truth" (A Collection of Songs Written and Recorded 1995-1997, 1998)
"Amy in the White Coat" (3 More Hit Songs From Bright Eyes, 2002, There Is No Beginning to the Story, 2002, and Noise Floor: Rarities 1998-2005, 2006)
"Another Travelin' Song" (I'm Wide Awake, It's Morning, 2005)
"Approximate Sunlight" (The People's Key, 2011)
"Arc of Time (Time Code)" (Digital Ash in a Digital Urn, 2005)
"Arienette" (Fevers and Mirrors, 2000)
"At the Bottom of Everything" (I'm Wide Awake, It's Morning, 2005, and Motion Sickness, 2005)
"An Attempt to Tip the Scales" (Fevers and Mirrors, 2000)
"Away in a Manger" (A Christmas Album, 2002)
"Awful Sweetness of Escaping Sweat" (A Collection of Songs Written and Recorded 1995-1997, 1998)

B
"Bad Blood" (Collaboration Series no. 1 7", 2002, and Noise Floor: Rarities 1998-2005, 2006)
"Beginner's Mind" (The People's Key, 2011)
"The Big Picture" (Lifted or The Story Is in the Soil, Keep Your Ear to the Ground, 2002)
"Black Comedy" (One Jug of Wine, Two Vessels, 2004)
"Blue Angels Air Show" (Noise Floor: Rarities 1998-2005, 2006)
"Blue Christmas" (A Christmas Album, 2002)
"Bowl of Oranges" (Lifted or The Story Is in the Soil, Keep Your Ear to the Ground, 2002)
"Burn Rubber" (Take It Easy (Love Nothing) single, 2004)

C
"Calais to Dover" (Down in the Weeds, Where the World Once Was, 2020)
"The Calendar Hung Itself..." (Fevers and Mirrors, 2000)
"Cartoon Blues" (Four Winds, 2007)
"A Celebration Upon Completion" (A Collection of Songs Written and Recorded 1995-1997, 1998)
"The Center of the World" (Fevers and Mirrors, 2000)
"The City Has Sex" (Letting Off the Happiness, 1998)
"Clairaudients (Kill or Be Killed)" (Cassadaga, 2007)
"Classic Cars" (Cassadaga, 2007)
"Cleanse Song" (Cassadaga, 2007)
"Coat Check Dream Song" (Cassadaga, 2007)
"Contrast and Compare" (Letting Off the Happiness, 1998)
"Comet Song" (Down in the Weeds, Where the World Once Was, 2020)
"Coyote Song" (free Download, 2010)
"Cremation" (Take It Easy (Love Nothing) single, 2004)

D
"Dance and Sing" (Down in the Weeds, Where the World Once Was, 2020)
"Devil in the Details" (Digital Ash in a Digital Urn, 2005)
"Devil Town" (The Late Great Daniel Johnston: Discovered Covered, 2004, and Noise Floor (Rarities: 1998-2005), 2006)
"The Difference in the Shades" (Letting Off the Happiness, 1998)
"Don't Know When But a Day's Gonna Come" (Lifted or The Story Is in the Soil, Keep Your Ear to the Ground, 2002)
"Down in a Rabbit Hole" (Digital Ash in a Digital Urn, 2005)
"Driving Fast Through a Big City at Night" (A Collection of Songs Written and Recorded 1995-1997, 1998)
"Drunk Kid Catholic" (3 New Hit Songs From Bright Eyes, 2001, and Noise Floor: Rarities 1998-2005, 2006)

E
"Easy/Lucky/Free" (Digital Ash in a Digital Urn, 2005, and Easy/Lucky/Free single, 2005)
"Emily, Sing Something Sweet" (A Collection of Songs Written and Recorded 1995-1997, 1998)
"Empty Canyon, Empty Canteen" (Letting Off the Happiness, 1998, Japanese bonus track)
"Endless Entertainment" (available when signing up for mailing list)
"Entry Way Song" (Amos House Collection, Vol. 2, 2002, and Noise Floor (Rarities: 1998-2005), 2006)
"Exaltation on a Cool Kitchen Floor" (A Collection of Songs Written and Recorded 1995-1997, 1998)

F
"Falling Out of Love at this Volume" (A Collection of Songs Written and Recorded 1995-1997, 1998)
"False Advertising" (Lifted or The Story Is in the Soil, Keep Your Ear to the Ground, 2002)
"Feb. 15th" (A Collection of Songs Written and Recorded 1995-1997, 1998)
"The 'Feel Good' Revolution" (A Collection of Songs Written and Recorded 1995-1997, 1998)
"Feeling It (For Ian)" (Too Much of a Good Thing is a Good Thing 7", 1999)
"Few Minutes on Friday" (A Collection of Songs Written and Recorded 1995-1997, 1998)
"Firewall" (The People's Key, 2011)
"First Day of My Life" (First Day of My Life single, 2005 and I'm Wide Awake, It's Morning, 2005)
"The First Noël" (A Christmas Album, 2002)
"Forced Convalescence" (Down in the Weeds, Where the World Once Was, 2020)
"Four Winds" (Four Winds, 2007 and Cassadaga, 2007)
"From a Balance Beam" (There Is No Beginning to the Story, 2002, and Lifted or The Story Is in the Soil, Keep Your Ear to the Ground, 2002)

G
"Go Find Yourself a Dry Place" (Bright Eyes / Squadcar 96)
"God Rest Ye Merry Gentlemen" (A Christmas Album, 2002)
"Going for the Gold" (Oh Holy Fools: The Music of Son, Ambulance & Bright Eyes, 2001, and Don't Be Frightened of Turning the Page, 2001)
"Gold Mine Gutted" (Digital Ash in a Digital Urn, 2005)

H
"Haile Selassie" (The People's Key, 2011)
"Haligh, Haligh, a Lie, Haligh" (Fevers and Mirrors, 2000)
"Happy Accident" (One Jug of Wine, Two Vessels, 2010 re-release)
"Happy Birthday to Me" (February 15)" (3 New Hit Songs From Bright Eyes, 2001, and Noise Floor: Rarities 1998-2005, 2006)
"Have You Ever Heard Of Jandek Before?" (Naked in the Afternoon: A Tribute to Jandek, 2000)
"Have Yourself a Merry Little Christmas" (A Christmas Album, 2002)
"Hit the Switch" (Digital Ash in a Digital Urn, 2005)
"Hot Car in the Sun" (Down in the Weeds, Where the World Once Was, 2020)
"Hot Knives" (Cassadaga, 2007)
"How Many Lights Do You See?" (A Collection of Songs Written and Recorded 1995-1997, 1998)
"Hungry for a Holiday" (Collaboration Series no. 1 7", 2002, and Noise Floor (Rarities: 1998-2005), 2006)

I
"I'll Be Your Friend" (One Jug of Wine, Two Vessels, 2004)
"I've Been Eating (For You)" (3 New Hit Songs From Bright Eyes, 2001, and Noise Floor: Rarities 1998-2005, 2006)
"I Believe in Symmetry" (Digital Ash in a Digital Urn, 2005)
"I Know You" (One Jug of Wine, Two Vessels, 2010 re-release)
"I Must Belong Somewhere" (Cassadaga, 2007)
"I Watched You Taking Off" (A Collection of Songs Written and Recorded 1995-1997, 1998)
"I Will Be Grateful for This Day, I Will Be Grateful for Each Day to Come" (I Will Be Grateful for This Day, I Will Be Grateful for Each Day to Come, 2001, and Noise Floor: Rarities 1998-2005, 2006)
"I Woke Up with this Song in My Head this Morning" (Lua single, 2004)
"I Won't Ever Be Happy Again" (Insound Tour Support Series No. 12, 2000, and Don't Be Frightened of Turning the Page, 2001)
"If the Brakeman Turns My Way" (Cassadaga, 2007)
"If Winter Ends" (Letting Off the Happiness, 1998)
"In the Real World" (Singularity, 2011)
"The Invisible Gardener" (A Collection of Songs Written and Recorded 1995-1997, 1998)
"It's Cool, We Can Still Be Friends" (Transmission One: Tea at the Palaz of Hoon, 2000, and Noise Floor: Rarities 1998-2005, 2006)

J
"Jejune Stars" (The People's Key, 2011)
"Jetsabel Removes the Undesirables" (Fevers and Mirrors, 2000, Japanese bonus track)
"The Joy in Discovery" (Insound Tour Support Series No. 12, 2000, and Fevers and Mirrors, 2000, Japanese bonus track)
"The Joy in Forgetting/The Joy in Acceptance" (Insound Tour Support Series No. 12, 2000)
"June on the West Coast" (Letting Off the Happiness, 1998)
"Just Once in the World" (Down in the Weeds, Where the World Once Was, 2020)

K
"Kathy with a K's Song" (Oh Holy Fools: The Music of Son, Ambulance & Bright Eyes, 2001, and Don't Be Frightened of Turning the Page, 2001)

L
"Ladder Song" (The People's Key, 2011)
"Lake Havasu (In Florida)" (Kill The Monster Before It Eats the Baby, 1996)
"Landlocked Blues" (I'm Wide Awake, It's Morning, 2005)
"Laura Laurent" (Lifted or The Story Is in the Soil, Keep Your Ear to the Ground, 2002)
"Let's Not Shit Ourselves (To Love and Be Loved)" (Lifted or The Story Is in the Soil, Keep Your Ear to the Ground, 2002)
"Let the Distance Bring Us Together" (Home Volume IV: Bright Eyes & Britt Daniel, 2002)
"Light Pollution" (Digital Ash in a Digital Urn, 2005)
"Lila" (A Collection of Songs Written and Recorded 1995-1997, 1998)
"Lime Tree" (Cassadaga, 2007)
"A Line Allows Progress, a Circle Does Not" (Every Day and Every Night, 1999)
"Little Drummer Boy" (A Christmas Album, 2002)
"Loose Leaves" (There Is No Beginning to the Story, 2002)
"Lover I Don't Have to Love" (3 More Hit Songs From Bright Eyes, 2002, and Lifted or The Story Is in the Soil, Keep Your Ear to the Ground, 2002)
"Lovers Turn Into Monsters" (Insound Tour Support Series No. 12, 2000)
"Lua" (Lua single, 2004, and I'm Wide Awake, It's Morning, 2005)

M
"A Machine Spiritual (In The People's Key)" (The People's Key, 2011)
"Make a Plan to Love Me" (Cassadaga, 2007)
"Make War" (Lifted or The Story Is in the Soil, Keep Your Ear to the Ground, 2002, and Motion Sickness, 2005)
"Man Named Truth" (Live, released on Monsters of Folk, 2009, with Monsters of Folk)
"Mariana Trench" (Down in the Weeds, Where the World Once Was, 2020)
"Messenger Bird's Song" (There Is No Beginning to the Story, 2002)
"Method Acting" (Lifted or The Story Is in the Soil, Keep Your Ear to the Ground, 2002, and Motion Sickness, 2005)
"Middleman" (Cassadaga, 2007)
"Mirrors and Fevers" (Don't Be Frightened of Turning the Page EP, 2001, and Noise Floor: Rarities 1998-2005, 2006)
"Motion Sickness" (Motion Sickness 7", 2000)
"The Movement of a Hand" (Fevers and Mirrors, 2000)

N
"Napoleon's Hat" (Lagniappe, 2005)
"Neely O'Hara" (Every Day and Every Night, 1999)
"A New Arrangement" (Every Day and Every Night, 1999)
"The Night Before Christmas" (A Christmas Album, 2002)
"No Lies, Just Love" (Oh Holy Fools: The Music of Son, Ambulance & Bright Eyes, 2001, and Don't Be Frightened of Turning the Page, 2001)
"No One Would Riot For Less" (Cassadaga, 2007)
"No Prayer" (Live)
"North of the City" (Kill The Monster Before It Eats the Baby, 1996)
"Nothing Gets Crossed Out" (Lifted or The Story Is in the Soil, Keep Your Ear to the Ground, 2002)

O
"Oh Little Town of Bethlehem" (A Christmas Album, 2002)
"Oh, You Are the Roots That Sleep Beneath My Feet and Hold the Earth in Place" (Oh Holy Fools: The Music of Son, Ambulance & Bright Eyes, 2001, and Don't Be Frightened of Turning the Page, 2001)
"Old Soul Song (For the New World Order)" (I'm Wide Awake, It's Morning, 2005, and Motion Sickness, 2005)
"On My Way to Work" (Every Day and Every Night, 1999)
"One and Done" (Down in the Weeds, Where the World Once Was, 2020)
"One for You, One for Me" (The People's Key, 2011)
"One Foot in Front of the Other" (Saddle Creek 50, 2002)
"One Straw (Please)" (A Collection of Songs Written and Recorded 1995-1997, 1998)

P
"Padraic My Prince" (Letting Off the Happiness, 1998)
"Pageturner's Rag" (Down in the Weeds, Where the World Once Was, 2020)
"Pan and Broom" (Down in the Weeds, Where the World Once Was, 2020)
"Patient Hope in New Snow" (A Collection of Songs Written and Recorded 1995-1997, 1998)
"A Perfect Sonnet" (Every Day and Every Night, 1999)
"Persona Non Grata" (Down in the Weeds, Where the World Once Was, 2020)
"Pioneer's Park (August 17, 1997)" ("Commercial Food Processor", 1999)
"A Poetic Retelling of an Unfortunate Seduction" (Letting Off the Happiness, 1998)
"Poison Oak" (I'm Wide Awake, It's Morning, 2005)
"Puella Quam Amo Est Pulchra" (A Collection of Songs Written and Recorded 1995-1997, 1998)
"Pull My Hair" (Letting Off the Happiness, 1998)

R
"Racing Towards The New" (Bright Eyes / Squadcar 96))
"Reinvent the Wheel" (Four Winds, 2007)
"Road to Joy" (I'm Wide Awake, It's Morning, 2005)

S
"Saturday As Usual" (A Collection of Songs Written and Recorded 1995-1997, 1998)
"A Scale, a Mirror and Those Indifferent Clocks" (Fevers and Mirrors, 2000, and Motion Sickness, 2005)
"Seashell Tale" (Noise Floor: Rarities 1998-2005, 2006)
"Shell Games" (The People's Key, 2011)
"Ship in a Bottle" (Digital Ash in a Digital Urn, 2005)
"Silent Night" (A Christmas Album, 2002)
"Singularity" ("Singularity" single, 2011)
"Silver Bells" (A Christmas Album, 2002)
"Smoke Without Fire" (Four Winds, 2007)
"Solid Jackson" (A Collection of Songs Written and Recorded 1995-1997, 1998)
"Something Vague" (Fevers and Mirrors, 2000, and Saddle Creek 50, 2002)
"A Song to Pass the Time" (Fevers and Mirrors, 2000)
"Soon You Will Be Leaving Your Man" (Motion Sickness 7", 2000)
"Soul Singer in a Session Band" (Cassadaga, 2007)
"Southern State" (Home Volume IV: Bright Eyes & Britt Daniel, 2002, and Motion Sickness, 2005)
"Spent on Rainy Days" (Home Volume IV: Bright Eyes & Britt Daniel, 2002, and Noise Floor: Rarities 1998-2005, 2006)
"A Spindle, a Darkness, a Fever, and a Necklace" (Fevers and Mirrors, 2000)
"Spring Cleaning" (One Jug of Wine, Two Vessels, 2004)
"Stairwell Song" (Down in the Weeds, Where the World Once Was, 2020)
"Stray Dog Freedom" (Four Winds, 2007)
"Sunrise, Sunset" (Fevers and Mirrors, 2000)
"Supriya" (A Collection of Songs Written and Recorded 1995-1997, 1998)
"Susan Miller Rag" (Susan Miller Rag 3-inch, shipped with pre-orders of Cassadaga)

T
"Take It Easy (Love Nothing)" (Take It Easy (Love Nothing) single, 2004, and Digital Ash in a Digital Urn, 2005)
"Tereza and Tomas" (Letting Off the Happiness, 1998)
"Theme From Pinata" (Digital Ash in a Digital Urn, 2005)
"Tilt-A-Whirl" (Down in the Weeds, Where the World Once Was, 2020)
"Time Code" (Digital Ash in a Digital Urn, 2005)
"To Death's Heart (In Three Parts)" (Down in the Weeds, Where the World Once Was, 2020)
"Touch" (Letting Off the Happiness, 1998)
"Tourist Trap" (Four Winds, 2007)
"Train Under Water" (I'm Wide Awake, It's Morning, 2005, and Motion Sickness, 2005)
"Trees Get Wheeled Away" (Lost & Found, Vol. 1 compilation, 2003, and Noise Floor: Rarities 1998-2005, 2006)
"Triple Spiral" (The People's Key, 2011)
"True Blue" (Lua single, 2004, First Day of My Life single, 2005, and Motion Sickness, 2005)

V
"The Vanishing Act" (Too Much of a Good Thing is a Good Thing 7", 1999, and Noise Floor: Rarities 1998-2005, 2006)

W
"Waste of Paint" (Lifted or The Story Is in the Soil, Keep Your Ear to the Ground, 2002)
"We Are Free Men" (There Is No Beginning to the Story, 2002)
"We Are Nowhere and It's Now" (I'm Wide Awake, It's Morning, 2005, and Motion Sickness, 2005)
"Weather Reports" (Noise Floor: Rarities 1998-2005, 2006)
"Well Whiskey" (Lua single, 2004)
"When the Curious Girl Realizes She Is Under Glass" (Fevers and Mirrors, 2000)
"When the Curious Girl Realizes She Is Under Glass Again" (I Will Be Grateful for This Day, I Will Be Grateful for Each Day to Come, 2001, and Noise Floor: Rarities 1998-2005, 2006)
"When the President Talks to God" (When the President Talks to God single, 2005, and First Day of My Life single, 2005)
"White Christmas" (A Christmas Album, 2002)

Y
"You Get Yours" (Home Volume IV: Bright Eyes & Britt Daniel, 2002)
"You Will. You? Will. You? Will. You? Will." (Lifted or The Story Is in the Soil, Keep Your Ear to the Ground, 2002)

Notable covers
"Big Old House" – originally by Jesse Harris (The Hottest State soundtrack, 2007)
"The Biggest Lie" – originally by Elliott Smith (Motion Sickness, 2005)
"Burn Rubber" – originally by Simon Joyner (Take It Easy (Love Nothing) single, 2004)
"Crazy As a Loon" – originally by John Prine
"Devil Town" – originally by Daniel Johnston (The Late Great Daniel Johnston: Discovered Covered, 2004, and Noise Floor: Rarities 1998-2005, 2006)
"I Woke Up With This Song in My Head This Morning" – originally by The Bruces (Lua single, 2004)
"Joy Division" – originally by Simon Joyner
"Metal Firecracker" – originally by Lucinda Williams
"Mushaboom" – originally by Feist (Motion Sickness, 2005)
"Out on the Weekend" – originally by Neil Young (3 More Hit Songs From Bright Eyes, 2002, and There Is No Beginning to the Story, 2002)
"Papa Was a Rodeo" – originally by The Magnetic Fields (SCORE! 20 Years of Merge Records: THE COVERS!, 2009)
"Sharp Cutting Wings (Song to a Poet)" – originally by Lucinda Williams
"Walls" – originally by Tom Petty and the Heartbreakers

See also
Bright Eyes discography
List of songs with Conor Oberst

External links
Saddle Creek Records

Bright Eyes